Mike Stanton may refer to:

Mike Stanton (right-handed pitcher) (born 1952), right-handed pitcher in Major League Baseball, played 1975–1985
Mike Stanton (left-handed pitcher) (born 1967), left-handed relief pitcher in Major League Baseball, played 1989–2007
Giancarlo Stanton (born 1989), formerly referred to as Mike Stanton, outfielder in Major League Baseball, played 2010–present